Norton Juster (June 2, 1929 – March 8, 2021) was an American academic, architect, and writer. He was best known as an author of children's books, notably for The Phantom Tollbooth and The Dot and the Line.

Early life
Juster was born in Brooklyn on June 2, 1929.  Both his parents were Jewish and immigrated to the United States.  His father, Samuel Juster, was born in Romania and became an architect through a correspondence course. His mother, Minnie Silberman, was of Polish Jewish descent.  His brother, Howard, became an architect as well.  Juster studied architecture at the University of Pennsylvania, obtaining a bachelor's degree in 1952.  He went on to study city planning at the University of Liverpool.

Career
Juster enlisted in the Civil Engineer Corps of the United States Navy in 1954, and rose to the rank of lieutenant junior grade. During one tour, to combat boredom, he began to write and illustrate a story for children, but the commanding officer later reprimanded him for it. Still, Juster also finished an unpublished satirical fairy tale called "The Passing of Irving".  Later posted in the Brooklyn Navy Yard, again to combat boredom, he made up a non-existent military publication called the Naval News Service as a scheme to request interviews with attractive women.  It worked so amazingly well that a neighbor asked to come along as his assistant.  His next scheme was to make the "Garibaldi Society" (inspired by a statue in Washington Square Park), whose raison d'être was to reject anyone who applied for membership, designing an impressive logo, application, and rejection letter. It was at this time he met Jules Feiffer while taking out the trash.

Approximately six months after meeting Feiffer, Juster received his discharge from the Navy, and worked for a Manhattan architectural firm.  He also did some part-time teaching and undertook other jobs. Juster, Feiffer, and another friend rented an apartment on State Street. Juster also resorted to pulling pranks occasionally on Feiffer.  Juster's children's novel, The Phantom Tollbooth, was published in 1961, with Feiffer doing the drawings.  This was followed by The Dot and the Line (1963), which became a standard book in classrooms around the country.  Juster went on to author Alberic the Wise and Other Journeys (1965), Stark Naked: A Paranomastic Odyssey (1969), Otter Nonsense (1982), and As Silly as Knees, as Busy as Bees (1998), among other works.  He also published A Woman's Place: Yesterday's Women in Rural America in 1996 for an adult audience, based on his personal experience of residing on a farm in Massachusetts.

Although Juster enjoyed writing, his architectural career remained his primary emphasis.  He served as a professor of architecture and environmental design at Hampshire College from 1970 to 1992, when he retired.  He also co-founded a small architectural firm, Juster Pope Associates, in Shelburne Falls, Massachusetts, in 1970. The firm was renamed Juster Pope Frazier after Jack Frazier joined the firm in 1978.

Later life
Juster lived in Massachusetts during his later years.  His wife, Jeanne, died in October 2018 after 54 years of marriage.  Although he retired from architecture, he continued to write for many years. His book The Hello, Goodbye Window, published May 15, 2005, won the Caldecott Medal for Chris Raschka's illustration in 2006.  The sequel, Sourpuss and Sweetie Pie, was published in 2008.  Two years later, he teamed up again with Feiffer for The Odious Ogre.

Juster died on March 8, 2021, at his home in Northampton, Massachusetts.  He was 91, and suffered from complications of a stroke prior to his death.

Books 
 The Phantom Tollbooth (1961), illustrated by Jules Feiffer
 The Dot and the Line: A Romance in Lower Mathematics (1963)
 Alberic the Wise and Other Journeys (1965)
 Stark Naked: A Paranomastic Odyssey (1969; Library of Congress Catalog Card No. 71-85568), illus. Arnold Roth
 So Sweet to Labor: Rural Women in America 1865–1895 (editor; 1979)—non-fiction
 Otter Nonsense (1982),  illus. Eric Carle
 As: A Surfeit of Similes (1989)
 A Woman's Place: Yesterday's Women in Rural America (1996)—non-fiction
 The Hello, Goodbye Window (Michael Di Capua Books, 2005), illus. Chris Raschka
 Sourpuss and Sweetie Pie (2008), illus. Chris Raschka
 The Odious Ogre (2010), illus. Jules Feiffer
 Neville (2011), illus. G. Brian Karas

Other media 
Both The Phantom Tollbooth and The Dot and the Line were adapted into films by animator Chuck Jones.  The latter film received the 1966 Academy Award for Best Animated Short Film.

The Phantom Tollbooth was also adapted into a musical by Norton Juster and Sheldon Harnick, with lyrics by Sheldon Harnick and music composed by Arnold Black.

There have been musical settings of "A Colorful Symphony" from The Phantom Tollbooth for narrator and orchestra and of The Dot and the Line for narrator and chamber ensemble by composer Robert Xavier Rodriguez.

References

External links 
 "Norton Juster: Phantom Toll Booth Designer" – 2007 profile at Central Rappahannock Regional Library, Virginia 
 Biography at MTIshows.com 
 Interview at Powells.com (October 10, 2006)
 Interview at Salon (March 12, 2001)
 Interview by RoseEtta Stone (2001) at Underdown.org 
 "Fifty Years of The Phantom Tollboth" by Adam Gopnik, The New Yorker, October 17, 2011
 
 

1929 births
2021 deaths
20th-century American male writers
20th-century American novelists
21st-century American Jews
21st-century American male writers
21st-century American novelists
American children's writers
American people of Polish-Jewish descent
American people of Romanian-Jewish descent
Architects from Massachusetts
Architects from New York City
Hampshire College faculty
Jewish American novelists
Military personnel from Massachusetts
Military personnel from New York City
Novelists from Massachusetts
Novelists from New York (state)
People from Amherst, Massachusetts
United States Navy officers
Writers from Brooklyn
Writers from Northampton, Massachusetts